Akhmerovo (Äxmär) is a rural locality (a village) in Mukasovsky Selsoviet, Baymaksky District, Bashkortostan, Russia. The population was 543 as of 2010. There are 7 streets.

Geography 
Akhmerovo is located 57 km northeast of Baymak (the district's administrative centre) by road. 1-ye Turkmenevo is the nearest rural locality.

References 

Rural localities in Baymaksky District